The Three-phase railcar (Ger:  Drehstrom-Triebwagen) was an experimental railcar built in Germany at the beginning of the 20th century to assess the possibilities in using electric motive power for rail transport.

Background
The 19th century saw the invention of the modern railway and their rapid expansion into national networks in Europe and worldwide.

The 1880s saw the development of electric power and its application to rail transport. Electric power offered several advantages over steam; it is more efficient, allowing more  rapid  acceleration, and  a higher power output when necessary. Its disadvantage is the high initial cost of the infrastructure involved, such as the power production and distribution system needed.
1879 saw the demonstration of an experimental system by  Werner von Siemens in Berlin, which was followed by an electric tramway at Lichterfelde, in 1881, and heavy rail applications in 1890 (the City and South London Railway) and 1895 (the Baltimore Belt Line).

In 1899 a consortium of ten of the largest and wealthiest companies in Germany joined together to form the "Research Association for High-speed Electric Railways"(de) (Studiengesellschaft für elektrische Schnellbahnen, or St.E.S.)  to examine the possibilities of high-speed electric rail travel.

Research Association for High-speed Electric Railways
This work was completed by the spring of 1901.

The three-phase railcar
The society commissioned two railcars for testing. The cars were of standard size, with a capacity for 50 passengers, mounted on two six-wheel bogies, the outer axle being motorized. The power was drawn down from the three power cables running along the side of the track by three vertical catenaries, mounted on two towers  fore and aft on the roof of the carriage.

These tests revealed weaknesses in the trackbed, which had to be re-laid. 
This set a railway speed record for electric locomotives which stood for the next 51 years.

The tests had shown what was possible with electric motive power, but the three-phase system was too complex, and the cost of installation too prohibitive, for general use across the rail network. With this the St.E.S was wound up and the infrastructure dismantled. 
However advances in technology, particularly in semiconductors, are believed to offer new possibilities with the three-phase system.

See also
Three-phase AC railway electrification

Notes

References
 

Rolling stock innovations
Land speed record rail vehicles
German inventions
Electric rail transport